is a Japanese politician serving in the House of Representatives in the Diet (national legislature) as a member of the New Komeito Party. A native of Wakayama, Wakayama and graduate of Doshisha University, he was elected for the first time in 1993 after working as a journalist.

References

External links 
  in Japanese.

1940 births
Living people
People from Wakayama (city)
Doshisha University alumni
Members of the House of Representatives (Japan)
New Komeito politicians
21st-century Japanese politicians